FASCIA is a database created and used by the U.S. National Security Agency that contains trillions of device-location records that are collected from a variety of sources.  Its existence was revealed during the 2013 global surveillance disclosure by Edward Snowden.

Scope of surveillance 

The FASCIA database stores various types of information, including Location Area Codes (LACs), Cell Tower IDs (CeLLIDs), Visitor Location Registers (VLRs), International Mobile Station Equipment Identity (IMEIs) and MSISDNs (Mobile Subscriber Integrated Services Digital Network-Numbers).

Over a period of about seven months, more than 27 terabytes of location data were collected and stored in the database.

Gallery

See also 
 Dishfire

References 

National Security Agency
American secret government programs
Intelligence agency programmes revealed by Edward Snowden